M0 (M followed by zero) or M-0 may refer to:

Companies
 Aero Mongolia, an airline based in Ulaanbaatar, Mongolia (IATA designation M0)

Places
 Megyeri Bridge (formerly known as Northern M0 Danube bridge), a bridge crossing the Danube River
 M0 motorway (Hungary), a ringroad around Budapest

Other uses
 M0 (economics), the monetary base regarding the money supply
 MØ (born 1988), Danish singer and songwriter
 M0, a non-small-cell lung carcinoma staging code for no distant metastasis
 M0, a type of macrophage, a type of defensive phagocytic cell in living things
 Hayes command set M0, a command for turning a modem speaker off
 Measure zero, or M0, the size of the null set
 M0 macrophage, a phenotype of macrophage

See also 
 Mo (disambiguation) 
 μ, the vacuum permeability
 , the solar mass